Burak Selçuk Ernak (born August 25, 1970 in Istanbul, Turkey) is a Turkish former professional basketball player and current head coach of Darüşşafaka.

Coaching career
In the 2016–17 season, Ernak led his team Sakarya BB to promotion to the first tier Basketbol Süper Ligi for the first time in club history.

On December 1, 2018, Ernak was fired by Sakarya after disappointing results in the early half of the 2018–19 season. On December 12, 2018, Ernak signed a two-year contract with Darüşşafaka. Darüşşafaka also played in the EuroLeague which meant the EuroLeague debut for Ernak.

References

External links
 Banvit Profile

1970 births
Living people
Banvit B.K. coaches
Basketbol Süper Ligi head coaches
Darüşşafaka Basketbol coaches
Sportspeople from Istanbul
Turkish basketball coaches
Turkish men's basketball players